McGhee is an unincorporated community in Cherokee County, Alabama, United States.

History
A post office called McGhee was established in 1897, and remained in operation until it was discontinued in 1903. The community was named for a local family of settlers.

References

Unincorporated communities in Cherokee County, Alabama
Unincorporated communities in Alabama